Paul Colline (stage name of Paul Louis Élisé Duard; 22 September 1895 in Paris – 8 November 1991 in Paris) was a French actor and screenwriter.

Selected filmography
 The Three Musketeers (1932)
 The Atomic Monsieur Placido (1950)
 Adémaï au poteau-frontière (1950)

1895 births
1991 deaths
French male film actors
French film directors
French male screenwriters
20th-century French screenwriters
French male singer-songwriters
20th-century French male actors
20th-century French male singers
20th-century French male writers
20th-century pseudonymous writers